Wheeleria lyrae is a moth of the family Pterophoridae that is endemic to Greece.

References

Pterophorini
Endemic fauna of Greece
Moths described in 1983
Plume moths of Europe
Taxa named by Ernst Arenberger